Based on Edward Bulwer-Lytton's 1834 novel of the same name, the film - one of two different adaptations of the same book in Italy that year - is set during the final days leading up to the Mount Vesuvius eruption in Pompeii in 79 AD.

Plot 
In Pompeii 79AD, Glaucus and Jone are in love with each other. Arbax, the Egyptian High Priest, is determined to conquer her. Glaucus buys the blind slave Nydia who is mishandled by her owner.

Nydia falls in love with him and asks Arbax for his help. He gives her a potion to make Glaucus fall in love with her. Unfortunately, to Nydia's dismay, the potion is actually a poison which will destroy his mind. Arbax' disciple Apoecides threatens to reveal publicly his wrongdoings. Arbax kills him and accuses Glaucus of the crime. He locks Nydia in a cellar to prevent her from speaking.

Glaucus is condemned to be thrown to the lions. Nydia manages to escape and tells Glaucus' friend Claudius what happened. Claudius rushes to the Circus to accuse Arbax and the crowd decides that Arbax and not Glaucus should be thrown to the lions.

The Vesuvius starts erupting and a widespread panic ensues. Under the shock, Glaucus recovers his mind. Blind Nydia, the only one to find her way in the darkness caused by the rain of ashes, leads Glaucus and Jone to safety and finds peace by drowning herself.

Cast 
 Suzanne De Labroy as Nydia
 Cristina Ruspoli as Jone
 Luigi Mele as Glaucus
 Giovanni Enrico Vidali as Arbaces
 Michele Cuisa as Caleno
 Ines Melidoni as Julia

Production
The film was produced by Pasquali e C.

References

External links 
 

1913 films
1913 adventure films
Italian disaster films
Italian epic films
Italian silent feature films
Films directed by Ubaldo Maria Del Colle
Pompeii in popular culture
Films set in ancient Rome
Films set in the Roman Empire
Films set in 79 AD
Films based on The Last Days of Pompeii
Articles containing video clips
Films about volcanoes
Italian black-and-white films
Italian adventure films
1910s disaster films
Silent adventure films